The Gran Premio Comité Olímpico Nacional is a one-day cycling race held annually in Costa Rica. It was first held in 2018 as part of the UCI America Tour in category 1.2.

Winners

References

Cycle races in Costa Rica
Recurring sporting events established in 2018
UCI Europe Tour races